Leif Anders Eriksson (born 20 March 1942) is a Swedish retired footballer and bandy player.

He started his career in Sweden playing for Djurgårdens IF, IK Sirius and Örebro SK, until he joined French side OGC Nice where he was elected foreign player of the year by France Football magazine in 1972. He ended his international career in another Côte d'Azur club, AS Cannes.

He was part of Swedish national football team at the 1970 FIFA World Cup. He was capped 49 times and scored 12 goals.

As a bandy player, Eriksson played for Djurgårdens IF Bandy 1961–65. In 1966, he won the Swedish championship final with IK Sirius.

Honours
Djurgårdens IF
 Division 2 Svealand: 1961
 Allsvenskan: 1964, 1966

References

External links
 
 

1942 births
Living people
Association football forwards
Swedish footballers
Sweden international footballers
Swedish expatriate footballers
Allsvenskan players
Djurgårdens IF Fotboll players
Örebro SK players
Ligue 1 players
OGC Nice players
AS Cannes players
1970 FIFA World Cup players
Expatriate footballers in France
Swedish expatriate sportspeople in France
IK Sirius Fotboll players
Swedish bandy players
IK Sirius players
Djurgårdens IF Bandy players